Marina Huerta Rosales (born 27 September 1934) is a Chilean politician who served the most part of her career as councilwoman of Valparaíso.

She was mayor of Valparaíso for a little over than one week after Jorge Castro's resignation to compete in the 2017 parliamentary elections.

References

External Links
 File about his work as councilwoman

1934 births
Living people
University of Valparaíso alumni
Christian Democratic Party (Chile) politicians
21st-century Chilean politicians